Sangita Ghosh (born 18 August 1976) is an Indian film and television actress and model. She is better known for her role of Pammi in the television serial Des Mein Niklla Hoga Chand. She has also anchored and hosted several award shows and television series. She anchored the show Nach Baliye with Shabbir Ahluwalia, where she also gave multiple dance performances. She is also known for her role as Pishachini in Divya Drishti.

Career
Ghosh started acting when she was ten years old, in a serial called Hum Hindustani. She has done a lot of modelling for brands like Donear Suitings and Nirma. She finished her college studies in 1996 and acted in serials like "Mehndi Tere Naam Ki" Sansaar (in the early 1990s of Dheeraj Kumar), Kurukshetra, Adhikar, Ajeeb Dastan and Daraar. After Daraar, she was cast in Des Mein Niklla Hoga Chand in which she played the role of Pammi. She portrayed the role of Priyanka Kharbanda / Priyanka Rahul Lamba on popular TV show Viraasat in 2006. She also participated in the reality dance show Zara Nachke Dikha 2 as the girls' team captain in 2010. Ghosh appeared on a daily soap after a leap of six years i.e. after Viraasat, she made her comeback on the TV show Kehta Hai Dil Jee Le Zara as Sanchi opposite actor Ruslaan Mumtaz on 15 August 2013. The show was praised for its fresh and unique concepts and Ghosh received wider appreciation for her chemistry with Mumtaz. The show ended in mid 2014. She then appeared in the second season of the daily soap Parvarrish. She also played the antagonist role of Sudha in Star Plus's thriller series Rishton Ka Chakravyuh. In February 2019, she was seen portraying Sachini, the antagonist in the TV show Divya Drishti. Her performance as Sachini received wider appreciation and the show was a commercial success. The show ended after a year long run in February 2020.

Personal life
In her early years, Ghosh also studied in Airport High School of Mumbai. Ghosh married polo player Rajvi Shailendra Singh Rathore of Jaipur in a private ceremony in 2011. In July 2022, Ghosh revealed that she and her husband were parents to a daughter who was born on 25 December 2021 via surrogacy. However she and her husband decided not to reveal the news as the baby was born premature and was in NICU for about 15 days. She further revealed that she had suffered a miscarriage in 2015 and it was devastating for her to lose her first child. The couple had named their daughter, Devi.

Filmography

Television

Awards

Won
 ITA Award for Best Anchor - Music & Film Based Show
 Indian Television Academy Award for Best Onscreen Couple (2013) - Ruslaan Mumtaz & Sangita Ghosh

Nominated
 Indian Telly Award for Best Actress in a Lead Role,
 Star Guild Award for Best Actress in a Drama Series
 Indian Telly Award for Best Anchor

References

External links

Living people
Female models from Madhya Pradesh
Indian television actresses
Indian female dancers
1976 births
Dancers from Madhya Pradesh
Actresses from Madhya Pradesh
20th-century Indian actresses
21st-century Indian actresses
Actresses in Hindi cinema
Actresses in Hindi television
People from Shivpuri district